Set Fire to the Stars is a 2014 Welsh semi-biographical drama film directed by Andy Goddard in his directorial debut. Co-written by Goddard and Celyn Jones, the film stars Elijah Wood as poet John M. Brinnin and Jones as Dylan Thomas with supporting roles by Kelly Reilly, Steven Mackintosh, Shirley Henderson, and Kevin Eldon. The film was released in the United Kingdom on 7 November 2014.

Premise
In 1950s New York, Harvard University graduate and aspiring poet John Malcolm Brinnin (Elijah Wood) embarks on a week-long retreat to save his hero, acclaimed Welsh poet Dylan Thomas (Celyn Jones).

Cast
 Elijah Wood as John Malcolm Brinnin
 Celyn Jones as Dylan Thomas
 Shirley Henderson as Shirley
 Kelly Reilly as Caitlin Thomas
 Steven Mackintosh as Jack
 Andrew Bicknell as Loomis
 Kate Drew as Janet
 Adam Gillen as Harvey
 Nicola Duffett as Lady Lye
 Steve Spiers as Mickey
 Ken Drury as Doctor
 Maimie McCoy as Rosie
 Richard Brake as Mr. Unlucky
 Polly Hemingway as Ms. Missy 1
 Sue Maund as Ms. Missy 2
 Kevin Eldon as Stanley
 Weston Gavin as Edgar S. Furniss

Release
Set Fire to the Stars premiered at the 2014 Edinburgh Film Festival.

Reception
On Rotten Tomatoes the film holds a 58% rating based on 43 reviews. The site's consensus states: "Set Fire to the Stars doesn't quite do justice to its legendary real-life protagonist, but thanks to Celyn Jones' spirited performance, it occasionally comes close." On Metacritic, the film has a 49 out of 100 rating based on 14 critics, indicating "mixed or average reviews".

References

External links
 
 

2014 films
2014 biographical drama films
British biographical drama films
Cultural depictions of Dylan Thomas
Films set in New York City
Films set in 1950
Films set in Connecticut
2014 directorial debut films
2014 drama films
Biographical films about poets
2010s English-language films
2010s British films